Epaphius is a genus of beetles belonging to the family Carabidae.

The species of this genus are found in Europe and Japan.

Species:
 Epaphius acco (Ueno, 1991)
Epaphius alpicola (Sturm, 1825)
Epaphius amplicollis (Fairmaire, 1859)
Epaphius apicalis (Motschulsky, 1865)
 Epaphius arsenjevi Jeannel, 1962
 Epaphius castificus Moravec & Wrase, 1998
Epaphius chalybeus (Dejean, 1831)
 Epaphius chinensis (Jeannel, 1920)
Epaphius coloradensis (Schaeffer, 1915)
Epaphius crassiscapus (Lindroth, 1955)
 Epaphius dorsistriatus (Morawitz, 1862)
 Epaphius ephippiatus (Bates, 1873)
 Epaphius hashimotoi (Ueno, 1961)
 Epaphius himalayanus (Ueno, 1972)
 Epaphius ikutanii (Ueno, 1961)
Epaphius latibuli (Jeannel, 1948)
Epaphius limacodes (Dejean, 1831)
 Epaphius matsumotoi (Ueno, 1984)
 Epaphius nishikawai (Ueno, 1991)
Epaphius ochreatus (Dejean, 1927)
Epaphius oregonensis (Hatch, 1951)
 Epaphius orientosinicus Deuve, 1992
Epaphius ovatus (Putzeys, 1845)
 Epaphius ozegaharanus (Ueno, 1954)
Epaphius pinkeri (Ganglbauer, 1892)
 Epaphius pirica (Ueno, 1992)
 Epaphius plutenkoi (Lafer, 1989)
 Epaphius qinlingensis Moravec & Wrase, 1998
 Epaphius rivularis (Gyllenhal, 1810)
Epaphius rubens (Fabricius, 1792)
Epaphius rudolphi (Ganglbauer, 1891)
 Epaphius secalis (Paykull, 1790)
 Epaphius shennongjianus Deuve, 2002
 Epaphius shushensis (Belousov & Kabak, 1994)
 Epaphius stheno Deuve, 2011
 Epaphius sugai (Ueno, 1984)
Epaphius tenuiscapus (Lindroth, 1961)
 Epaphius tiani Deuve, 2002
 Epaphius tosioi (Ueno, 1972)
 Epaphius vicarius (Bates, 1883)
Epaphius wagneri (Ganglbauer, 1906)
 Epaphius yosiianus (Ueno, 1954)
Epaphius yvesbousqueti (Donabauer, 2010)

References

Carabidae
Carabidae genera